Postles is a surname. Notable people with the surname include:

Alfred Postles (1903–1976), New Zealand cricketer
Bryce Postles (1931–2011), New Zealand cricketer
Charles Postles Jr., American politician
James P. Postles (1840–1908), American soldier

See also
Postle (surname)
Postles House